Saburo Kurata (21 September 1902 – 30 November 1992) was a Japanese painter. His work was part of the painting event in the art competition at the 1936 Summer Olympics.

References

1902 births
1992 deaths
20th-century Japanese painters
Japanese painters
Olympic competitors in art competitions
People from Tokyo